Haji Abid Ghoffar bin Aboe Dja’far or better known as Ebiet G. Ade (born in Wonodadi, Banjarnegara, Central Java, Indonesia on 21 April 1955) is an Indonesian singer-songwriter and guitarist of Javanese descent.

Early life
Ebiet G. Ade was born in Wonodadi, Banjarnegara, Central Java on 21 April 1955. He lived in Yogyakarta since elementary school. During high school, he joined Pelajar Islam Indonesia. In 1971, he associated with artists Yogyakarta, including Emha Ainun Nadjib. He was interested in poetry and wanted to be a poet. However, he was unable to read poems properly. He instead sang his poems after adding melodies.

Musical career

Albums
In 1979, he released his first studio album, Camellia I. His voice is similar to John Denver and Said Effendi. Notable songs from this album were "Lagu untuk Sebuah Nama" ("Song for a Name"), "Pesta" ("Party") and "Camellia". The album was sold more than 2 million copies.

In 1995, Kupu-Kupu Kertas (Paper Butterflies) was released. In this album, Ebiet was helped by his fellow musicians, including Billy J. Budiardjo, Erwin Gutawa, Ian Antono and Purwacaraka. Rock music is dominant in this album.

In 2007, he released In Love: 25th Anniversary which was dedicated to his wife of 25 years. The album was released by Trinity Optima Production. During production, he was helped by Anto Hoed and his children. There are 15 singles from album Camellia I to Camellia 4 on this album.

Singles
Most of Ebiet's songs are about disaster. In June 1978, Ebiet wrote "Berita Kepada Kawan" ("News for a Friend") after a poisonous gas disaster in Dieng Plateau. In 1981, he wrote "Sebuah Tragedi 1981" ("A Tragedy, 1981") regarding the sinking of KMP Tampomas II in the Masalembu Islands. After 1982 Galunggung eruption, he wrote "Untuk Kita Renungkan" ("For Us to Think About"), while the Bintaro train crash inspired him to write "Masih Ada Waktu" ("There is Still Time").

Another theme of his songs is love, such as in "Lagu Untuk Sebuah Nama", "Elegi Esok Pagi" ("Elegy for Tomorrow") and "Cinta di Kereta Biru Malam" ("Love on the Blue Night Train"), which is about a romantic relationship with a girl on a train.

Awards
Rolling Stone Indonesia put his name into 50 Greatest Indonesian Singers.

Personal life
He married Yayuk Sugianto (Koespudji Rahayu) in 1982. They have 4 children together, Abietyasakti Ksatria Kinasih, Aderaprabu Hantip Trengginas, Byatriasa Pakarti Linuwih and Segara Banyu Bening.

Discography
Camellia I (1979)
Camellia II (1979)
Camellia III (1980)
Camellia 4 (1980)
Langkah Berikutnya (1982)
Tokoh-Tokoh (1982)
1984 (1984)
Zaman (1985)
Isyu! (1986)
Menjaring Matahari (1987)
Sketsa Rembulan Emas (1988)
Seraut Wajah (1990)
Kupu-Kupu Kertas (1995)
Cinta Sebening Embun (1995)
Aku Ingin Pulang (1996)
Gamelan (1998)
Balada Sinetron Cinta (2000)
Bahasa Langit (2001)
In Love: 25th Anniversary (2007)
Masih Ada Waktu (2008)
Serenade (2013)

References

Bibliography

External links 

1954 births
Living people
Indonesian country singers
20th-century Indonesian male singers
Anugerah Musik Indonesia winners
20th-century Indonesian poets
People from Yogyakarta
Javanese people
Banyumasan people
Indonesian male poets
20th-century male writers
21st-century Indonesian male singers